Snip-Snap-Snorum, or Snip-Snap-Snorem (sometimes unhyphenated), is a matching-type card game, mostly played by children, and has several variants.  The game dates to at least the 18th century, and probably derives from a more ancient drinking and gambling game. References to "Snip, snap, snorum", which seems to be the original spelling, go back to at least 1755.

History 
A 1755 edition of The Connoisseur newspaper mentions Snip-Snap-Snorum being played in Wiltshire, the author recounting a visit where a group of "country girls and cherry-cheeked bumkins" played the game around a large table as part of a Christmas tradition, along with the card game Pope Joan. The game is mentioned in Christopher Smart's 1767 translation of the works of Horace, where he adds a footnote to his translated text "After this fare we had a play, To take our glass in turn, or pay", noting that he regards this as "a game like snip, snap, snorum." The game is mentioned by the English novelist Frances Burney in 1782.

The game appears, as Chnif Chnof Chnorum, in 1782 and 1790 in France. Vilmar describes it as a children's game popular in the early 19th century in Germany, the original and proper name of which was Schnipp, Schnapp, Schnorum, Apostelorum although the last word, which means "of the apostles" became corrupted to the meaningless word, "Basalorum". Five villages in 19th-century Sweden were named after the Swedish equivalent, Snipp, snapp, snorum, hej basalorum: Snipp, Snapp, Snorum, Hej and Basalorum.

The game
There are several methods of playing the game, but in the most common a full Whist pack is used and any number of players may take part. The pack is dealt, one card at a time, and the eldest hand places upon the table any card of his choosing. Each player in his turn then tries to match the card played just before his; playing it while saying one of the prescribed words: "Snip!", "Snap!" or "Snorem!" in sequence. Thus, if a King is played, the next player lays down another King (if one is in-hand) calling out "Snip!". The next player may lay down the third King if available, saying "Snap!", and the next the fourth King with the word "Snorem!". A player not being able to pair the card played may not discard, and the holder of snorem has the privilege of beginning the next round. The player who gets rid of all cards in-hand first wins a counter from the other players for each card still held by them.

Variations

Earl of Coventry
Earl of Coventry is just the same, but played without counters for a simple win. The leader says "There's as good a 6 can be" (if they had played a six). The second player says "There's a 6 as good as he", the third "There's the best of all the three", and the fourth "And there's the Earl of Coventry". Optionally, players may be required to make a different rhyming statement every time they play a fourth card.

Jig
A related game called Jig is somewhat a cross between Snip-Snap and Stops, in that the aim of succeeding players is not to match rank but to play the next higher card of the same suit, from Ace low to King high. 

The leader plays any card and says "Snip", and the next four able to continue the sequence announce respectively "Snap", "Snorum", "Hicockalorum", "Jig". The last turns down the five-card sequence and starts a new one. When a sequence cannot be continued because the last card was a King or the next card has been played out, the last player says "Jig" regardless of position, and leads to the next round. As before, the first out of cards receives 1 counter for each card left in other players' hands.

Niddy-Noddy 
Moor describes an old Suffolk variant allows that any number to play. The cards are all dealt out and elder plays one, saying or singing "there's a good card for thee," passing it to the right. The next person with a card of the same rank says "there's a still better than he," and passes both onward. The person with the third says "there's the best of all three" and the holder of the fourth crowns it all with "And there is Niddy-Noddeee!", winning the tack (trick) and starting again. Moor acknowledges an alternative final line of "and there's the Lord Mayor of Coventreee!"

Schnipp-Schnapp-Schnurr-Burr-Basilorum 
An extended version called Schnipp Schnapp Schnurr Burr Basilorum is played in Germany. Kings are not stops but are followed by Ace, Two, etc.
The rules are recorded as early as 1868 in the Electorate of Hesse under their original name of Schnipp Schnapp Schnurr Apostolorum, the last word "also being abbreviated to Bostelorum or Bastelorum" and, later, Baselorum. In the variant described by Vilmar, players must lead either with a Seven or a Jack. He goes on to explains that the original meaning was to imply a game being played between the Four Apostles or Evangelists, but that its corruption to Baselorum by another author diminished its potential irreverence.

See also
 One-card
 Slapjack
 Egyptian ratscrew
 Snipp, Snapp, Snorum, Hej and Basalorum - five villages in Skellefteå Municipality, Västerbotten County, Sweden, named after called-out terms in the German variant of the game

References

Bibliography 
 _ (1782). Encyclopédie Méthodique: ou Par Ordre de Matières: Par une Société de Gens del Lettres, de Savans et d'Artistes.. Agasse, Paris.
 Huvier des Fontenelles, Pierre M. (1790). Les Soirées amusantes ou entretien sur les jeux à gages ou d'autres, Veuve Duchesne et fils, Paris, 2nd edn.
 Moor, Edward (1823). Suffolk Words and Phrases. London: Loder.
 
 Smart, Christopher (1767). The Works of Horace. Flexney, Johnson and Caslon, London
 Vilmar, Dr. August Friedrich Christian (1868). Idiotikon von Kurhessen. R.G. Elwertsche Universitäts-Buchhandlung, Marburg and Leipzig.

French deck card games
Shedding-type card games
English card games
Card games for children